Eburia championi is a species of beetle in the family Cerambycidae, that can be found in Costa Rica and Mexico.

References

championi
Beetles described in 1880